The men's team sepak takraw competition at the 1990 Asian Games in Beijing was held from 24 September to 28 September at the Fengtai Gymnasium.

A total of five teams participated in this event.

Malaysia won the gold medal after winning all four matches, Thailand finished second with 3–1 record. Malaysia beat Thailand 2–1 in the last group match to secure the gold medal. Malaysia won first and third Regu both of them 2–1 while Thailand only won the second Regu 2–0.

Singapore won the bronze medal after beating two other teams in the competition, China and Brunei. China also beat Brunei in the last match of the competition 2–1 to finish 4th.

Results

References

External links
 Olympic Council of Asia

Sepak takraw at the 1990 Asian Games